
Gmina Mogilno is an urban-rural gmina (administrative district) in Mogilno County, Kuyavian-Pomeranian Voivodeship, in north-central Poland.

Villages
Apart from the town of Mogilno, Gmina Mogilno contains the villages and settlements of: 
 
 Baba
 Bąbowo
 Białotul
 Bielice
 Bystrzyca
 Bzówiec
 Chabsko
 Chałupska
 Czaganiec
 Czarnotul
 Czerniak
 Dąbrówka
 Dębno
 Dzierzążno
 Gębice
 Głęboczek
 Góra
 Goryszewo
 Gozdanin
 Gozdawa
 Huta Padniewska
 Huta Palędzka
 Iskra
 Izdby
 Józefowo
 Kamionek
 Kątno
 Kołodziejewko
 Kopce
 Kopczyn
 Krzyżanna
 Krzyżownica
 Kunowo
 Kwieciszewo
 Leśnik
 Łosośniki
 Lubieszewo
 Marcinkowo
 Mielenko
 Mielno
 Niestronno
 Olsza
 Padniewko
 Padniewo
 Palędzie Dolne
 Palędzie Kościelne
 Płaczkówko
 Procyń
 Przyjma
 Ratowo
 Sadowiec
 Skrzeszewo
 Stawiska
 Strzelce
 Świerkówiec
 Szczeglin
 Szerzawy
 Szydłówko
 Targownica
 Twierdziń
 Wasielewko
 Wiecanowo
 Wieniec
 Wszedzień
 Wylatowo
 Wymysłowo Szlacheckie
 Wyrobki
 Żabienko
 Żabno
 Zbytowo

Neighbouring gminas
Gmina Mogilno is bordered by the gminas of Dąbrowa, Gąsawa, Janikowo, Orchowo, Rogowo, Strzelno and Trzemeszno.

References
Polish official population figures 2006

Mogilno
Mogilno County